An oil rig is any kind of apparatus constructed for oil drilling.

Kinds of oil rig include:
 Drilling rig, an apparatus for on-land oil drilling
 Drillship, a floating apparatus for offshore oil drilling
 Oil platform, an apparatus for offshore oil drilling
 Oil well, a boring from which oil is extracted

Petroleum engineering